Udo Röhrig (born 2 June 1943) is an East German former handball player who competed in the 1972 Summer Olympics.

He was born in Groß-Ottersleben.

In 1972 he was part of the East German team which finished fourth in the Olympic tournament. He played five matches and scored seven goals.

External links
profile

1943 births
Living people
Sportspeople from Magdeburg
German male handball players
Olympic handball players of East Germany
Handball players at the 1972 Summer Olympics